Neritoidea is a taxonomic superfamily of mostly sea snails, nerites and their allies, marine gastropod mollusks in the order Cycloneritida (according to the taxonomy of the Gastropoda by Bouchet & Rocroi, 2005). 

Previously this superfamily was in the order Neritoida in the superorder Neritopsina.

Families
Families within the superfamily Neritoidea are as follows (according to the taxonomy of the Gastropoda by Bouchet & Rocroi, 2005):
 † Cortinellidae Bandel, 2000 
 † Neridomidae Bandel, 2008 
 † Neritariidae Wenz, 1938 
 Neritidae, the nerites, freshwater and marine species
 † Otostomidae Bandel, 2008 
 † Parvulatopsidae Gründel, Keupp & Lang, 2015 
 Phenacolepadidae Pilsbry, 1895, false limpets
 † Pileolidae Bandel, Gründel & P. A. Maxwell, 2000
Synonyms
 Protoneritidae Kittl, 1899 †: synonym of Neritinae Rafinesque, 1815
 Scutellidae Angas, 1871: synonym of Phenacolepadidae Pilsbry, 1895 (invalid: type genus a junior homonym)
 Scutellinidae Dall, 1889: synonym of Phenacolepadidae Pilsbry, 1895 (invalid: type genus a junior homonym)
 Septariidae Jousseaume, 1894: synonym of Neritidae Rafinesque, 1815 (a junior synonym)
 Shinkailepadidae Okutani, Saito & Hashimoto, 1989: synonym of Shinkailepadinae Okutani, Saito & Hashimoto, 1989

References

 Bouchet P., Rocroi J.P., Hausdorf B., Kaim A., Kano Y., Nützel A., Parkhaev P., Schrödl M. & Strong E.E. (2017). Revised classification, nomenclator and typification of gastropod and monoplacophoran families. Malacologia. 61(1-2): 1-526. 

Marine gastropods
Gastropod superfamilies
Taxa named by Constantine Samuel Rafinesque